"Electric Blue" is a song by Australian rock band Icehouse. It was co-written by Iva Davies of Icehouse and John Oates of US band Hall & Oates. Oates became involved with Davies after contacting him to state he was a fan. The resulting collaboration produced this song and Oates has stated that if Davies had not released the song under the Icehouse name, then it would have been a Hall & Oates track.

"Electric Blue" released in August 1987 as the second single from Icehouse's fifth studio album, Man of Colours (1987). It was issued through Regular Records in Australia and through Chrysalis Records in Europe and North America. In Australia, "Electric Blue" was available for a limited time on 7-inch blue vinyl. It is played regularly on Australian radio stations and remains one of their most popular songs according to listeners of Triple M in 2007.

"Electric Blue" reached number one on the Australian Music Report, number seven on the US Billboard Hot 100, number 10 on the Canadian RPM 100 Singles chart, and number four on New Zealand's RIANZ Singles Chart. In the United Kingdom, where the song was released in April 1988, it stalled at number 53 on the UK Singles Chart the following month.

Background
John Oates created the falsetto backing vocals as one of the first parts of the song, which took Iva Davies by surprise, because he was used to adding backing vocals as a finishing touch. Davies said the title was inspired by the 1970 T. Rex song "Jewel", which contains the verse, "Her eyes electric blue". Davies said, "I was taken by the description of a girl's eyes as 'electric blue'."

Music video
The music video for "Electric Blue" was shot on the roof of the New South Wales Teachers Federation building at 23-33 Mary Street, Surry Hills, Sydney, Australia. The actress featured in the video is Paris Jefferson, who also appeared in the music video for Icehouse's previous single, "Crazy".

Remixes and covers
A remix version by Skipraiders was released on the Icehouse album Meltdown in 2002. American indie rock band the Killers performed the song in a livestream in August 2020, which Davies later called "the most impressive" cover he'd seen.

Track listings

7-inch and US cassette single
A. "Electric Blue"
B. "Over My Head"

Australian 12-inch and cassette single
 "Electric Blue" (12-inch)
 "Electric Blue" (7-inch)
 "Electric Blue" (dub version mix)
 "Over My Head"

UK 12-inch single
A1. "Electric Blue" (extended mix) – 7:32
B1. "Electric Blue" (dub mix) – 5:03
B2. "Over My Head" – 3:48

UK CD single
 "Electric Blue" (extended mix)
 "Crazy" (Manic mix)
 "Over My Head"

Charts

Weekly charts

Year-end charts

Release history

References

1987 songs
1987 singles
APRA Award winners
Chrysalis Records singles
Icehouse (band) songs
Number-one singles in Australia
Regular Records singles
Songs written by Iva Davies
Songs written by John Oates